The Fosters is an American drama series which aired on Freeform (formerly ABC Family) from June 3, 2013 to June 6, 2018.

A total of 104 episodes were broadcast over five seasons.

Series overview

Episodes

Season 1 (2013–14)

Season 2 (2014–15)

Season 3 (2015–16)

Season 4 (2016–17)

Season 5 (2017–18)

Webisodes

The Fosters: Girls United
At the start of the second part of the first season of The Fosters, a five-episode web series called The Fosters: Girls United was confirmed by ABC Family. It stars Maia Mitchell, Daffany Clark, Cherinda Kincherlow, Annamarie Kenoyer, Alicia Sixtos, Hayley Kiyoko, and Angela Gibbs. Girls United premiered on ABC Family's official YouTube account on February 3, 2014. Each episode runs approximately 5 minutes long.

Ratings

References

Fosters, The
Episodes